Randeep Guleria is an Indian pulmonologist and the ex-director of the All India Institute of Medical Sciences, New Delhi, credited with the establishment of India's first centre for pulmonary medicines and sleep disorders at AIIMS. He was honoured by the Government of India in 2015 with Padma Shri, the fourth highest Indian civilian award. He is a part of India's COVID-19 response effort.

Guleria is co-author of popular book Till We Win: India's Fight Against The COVID-19 Pandemic, with Chandrakant Lahariya, a leading Indian physician, and Wellness & Preventive Medicine specialist and Gagandeep Kang of Christian Medical College, Vellore. 
Randeep Guleria is son of Padma Shri Jagdev Singh Guleria, a cardiologist, and is elder brother to Padma Shri Sandeep Guleria, a surgeon.

Biography

An alumnus of the class of 1975 of St. Columba's School, Delhi, Dr Guleria started his medical studies at IGMC, Shimla, affiliated to Himachal Pradesh University from where he received undergraduate degree in Medicine, afterwards he attended the Post Graduate Institute of Medical Education and Research (PGIMER) Chandigarh, from where he secured his MD in general medicine and DM in pulmonary medicine. He joined the All India Institute of Medical Sciences and rose in ranks to become a professor and the head of the department of Pulmonology and Sleep Disorders. He is associated with the World Health Organization (WHO) as a member of its Scientific Advisory Group of Experts (SAGE) on immunization and influenza vaccination. He is a life member of the Association of Physicians of India, Indian Chest Society and the National College of Chest Physicians of India. He also serves as a consultant to International Atomic Energy Agency (IAEA), Vienna on issues related to radiation protection.

Guleria was the personal physician to Atal Bihari Vajpayee, former Prime Minister of India since 1998 and is credited with research on pulmonary diseases. His research findings have been recorded by way of 36 book chapters and 268 articles; ResearchGate, an online knowledge repository has published 117 of them. He is credited with efforts in establishing a centre for respiratory diseases and sleep medicine at AIIMS, which is reported to be a first in India. He is a recipient of Raj Nanda Pulmonary Disease Fellowship from Raj Nanda Trust and the Royal College of Physicians, UK and is an elected fellow (2011) of the National Academy of Medical Sciences (NAMS). He sits on the editorial boards of a number of medical journals such as the Indian Journal of Chest Diseases, Lung India, JAMA: The Journal of the American Medical Association and Chest India.

Randeep Guleria was included by the Government of India in the 2015 Republic Day honours list for the civilian award of Padma Shri. He lives in Delhi, adjacent to the AIIMS campus.

He has been awarded the prestigious Dr. B C Roy National Awards for the year 2014, under eminent medical person category by the Medical Council of India.

Till We Win: The Book 
Till We Win: India's fight against the COVID-19 Pandemic is a book authored by Chandrakant Lahariya, Gagandeep Kang and Randeep Guleria.

See also

 Pulmonology
 Sleep disorder
 All India Institute of Medical Sciences
 International Atomic Energy Agency

References

Further reading

External links
 
 

Recipients of the Padma Shri in medicine
Living people
20th-century Indian medical doctors
Indian medical academics
Academic staff of the All India Institute of Medical Sciences, New Delhi
World Health Organization officials
Indian medical researchers
Indian medical writers
Indian pulmonologists
Fellows of the National Academy of Medical Sciences
Indian officials of the United Nations
Dr. B. C. Roy Award winners
1959 births
Directors of the All India Institute of Medical Sciences, New Delhi